The Saudi Second Division is the Third level football competition in Saudi Arabia. Qualified three teams to Saudi First Division.

Teams

Final league table

Third place match

Final

External links 
 Saudi Arabia Football Federation 
 Saudi League Statistics
 goalzz

Saudi Second Division seasons
2011–12 in Saudi Arabian football